This is the list of hospitals in Dubai.

Hospitals and clinics under Dubai Health Authority (DHA) 
Mediclinic Parkview Hospital 
 HMS Mirdif Hospital Dubai - Best Hospital in Dubai
 HMS Al Garhoud Hospital Dubai - Best Hospital in Dubai
 Al Jalila Children's Specialty Hospital
 Dr. Sulaiman Al Habib Medical Center - Sheikh Zayed Road
 Armada Hospital, Jumeirah Lake Towers, Armada Towers, Dubai (Private)
 Armada Medical Center, Jumeirah Lake Towers, Armada Towers, Dubai (Private)
 Dubai Hospital (Dubai Government DOHMS)
 Fakeeh University Hospital (Private)
Iranian Hospital (Private hospital by Iranian Red Crescent Society)
 Latifa Hospital (known before as Al Wasl Hospital) (Dubai Government DOHMS)
 Rashid Hospital (Dubai Government DOHMS)
 Saudi German Hospital Dubai (Private)
 Sultan Al Olama Medical Center

Hospitals under Dubai Healthcare City (DHCC) authority 
 Dr. Sulaiman Al Habib Hospital & Medical Center
 Mediclinic City Hospital
 Clemenceau Medical Center - Dubai

See also

List of hospitals in the United Arab Emirates

References

Hospitals, Dubai
Hospitals
Dubai